Cucao and Huillinco are two lakes in central Chiloé Island, Chile, linked by a strait forming one hydrologic lake. The two lakes are oriented in west-east fashion cutting off the Chilean Coast Range in Chiloé Island into two ranges; Piuchén to north and Pirulil to the south. The outlet of the lakes, Desaguadero or Cucao River lies at the western end of Cucao Lake, and flows into the Pacific.

Lakes of Chile
Lakes of Los Lagos Region